The Standard Code may refer to:
 The Standard Code of Parliamentary Procedure
 The Standard Code or the standard code in genetics refers to the standard genetic code, described at Genetic code#RNA codon table (see also DNA codon table)